M. Suyanto (Mohammad Suyanto) is the Rector of University of AMIKOM Yogyakarta, an Indonesian movie producer and writer known for Battle of Surabaya. He is also Professor of Strategic Management, Marketing and E-Business. Suyanto wrote several books most notably "Muhammad Business Strategy and Ethics", Oscar Winner and Box Office: The Secret of Secreenplay.

Education
Suyanto founded a private university in Yogyakarta, on October 11, 1994, STMIK Amikom. A decade later, Universitas Amikom Yogyakarta was highlighted as a leading example for "A New Dynamic: Private Higher Education” by UNESCO at World Conference on Higher Education 2009.

Suyanto received his PhD in economics from Airlangga University in 2007 and his Bachelor of Science degree in physics from Gadjah Mada University in 1987.  He received his Master in Management from Gadjah Mada University in 1993.

Books
 Visual Effects of Oscar Winners and Box Office (Andi Yogyakarta, 2021)
 Editing of Oscar Winners and Box Office (Andi Yogyakarta, 2021)
 Cinematography of Oscar Winners and Box Office (Andi Yogyakarta, 2020)
 Alchemy: Skills for Success and Happiness (Andi Yogyakarta, 2020)
 From A Start-Up To A Unicorn (Andi Yogyakarta, 2019)
 Starting A Business From Zero (Andi Yogyakarta, 2019)
 Muhammad Marketing Strategy (Andi Yogyakarta, 2018)
 Photopreneurship (Andi Yogyakarta, 2017)
 The Secret of Taiwan SME Worldwide in Creative Industries (Andi Yogyakarta, 2015)
 The Oscar Winner and Box Office: The Secret of Screenplay (Andi Yogyakarta, 2014)
 Battle of Surabaya: The Adventure of Musa (Seri Cinta Tanah Air) (Andi Yogyakarta, 2014)
 Muhammad Business Strategy and Ethics
 Strategic Management
 Marketing Strategy
 Strategy Revolution
 Outdoor Advertising Strategy
 Design Strategy for Cartoon Film
 Organizational Revolution
 15 Secrets to Change Failure to Be Success
 Being Smart in Leadership, Information Technology for Business
 11 Secrets To Start Business Without any Capital of Money
 Analysis & Design of Multimedia Application for Marketing
 Television Advertising Strategy
 Being Smart in Entrepreneurship
 Graphical Design Application for Advertising
 E-Commerce Advertising Strategy
 Designing a World Class Cartoon Film, Andi Yogyakarta, 2006.
 SMART IN Leadership: Learning from the World's Top Leaders, Andi Yogyakarta, 2005
 Introduction to Information Technology for Business, Andi Yogyakarta, 2005
 Analysis & Design of Multimedia Applications for Marketing, Andi Yogyakarta, 2004.
 Multimedia Tools to Increase Competitive Advantage, Andi Yogyakarta, 2003.

Awards
 Best Feature. PRISMA (Rome Independent Film Awards). 2018. Roma, Italia.
 Best Animation. Glendale International Film Festival. 2018. Glendale, USA.
 Official Selection Of Feature Animation.  Woodbury International Film Festival.  2019. Salt Lake City, USA. 
 Official Selection Of Best Feature.  North Europe International Film Festival. 2018.  London, United Kingdom.
 Silver Award Of Digital Content.  AICTA (ASEAN Information And Communication Technology Awards). 2018.  Bali, Indonesia. 
 Semi-Finalist. Sydney Indie Film Festival. 2018. Sydney, Australia.
 Best Animation,Hollywood International Motion Pictures Film Festival 2018
 Best Animation Film, European Cinematography Awards, 2018
 Best Animation, Amsterdam International Film Festival 2018
 Nominee Best Film, Amsterdam International Film Festival 2018
 Nominee Best Sound Design, Amsterdam International Film Festival 2018
 Best Animation,London, Gold Movie Awards 2018
 Best Animation,Oniros Film Awards 2018
 Outstanding Achievement Award - Animated Film, Calcutta International Cult Film Festival 2018.
 Best Animation Feature Film, Shouthern Cone International Film Festival 2018
 Best Animation, Festival  International De Cine Del Cono Sur, 2018
 Best Animation, Venezuela, Ficocc Five Continents International Film Festival 2018
 Best Writer, Toronto, ATFF SPRING Film Festival 2018
 Nominee Best Animation, London International Film Festival 2018
 Nominee Best Original Screenplay, of A Feature Film, London International Film Festival 2018
 Nominee Best Editing, of A Feature Film, London International Film Festival 2018
 The Best Alumni, Category Innovation, Design and Creativity, Universitas Gadjah Mada, 2017.
 Best Animation,Milan International Film Festival 2017
 Best Animation,Berlin International Film Festival 2017
 Best Animation,Nice International Film Festival 2017
 Figure Change Award, Republika 2016.
 Gold Remi Award, Worldfest, Houston, International Film Festival 2016
 Grandprize Winner, SICAF 2016, The 20th Seoul International Cartoon & Animation Festival
 Winner Best Animation, 3rd Noida International Film Festival 2016
 Official Selection, Holland Animation Film Festival 2016
 Official Selection, Animation Dingle, Ireland 2016
 Special Screening, New Chitose Airport Animation Festival Japan, 2016
 Special Screening, Athens Animfest, Greece, 2016
 The Faces of Indonesia Cinema Today, 10th Jogja NETPAC Asian Film Festival 2015
 Winner National Intellectual Property Award 2015-Creative Human -Creative Economy field
 Nominated for Best Foreign Animation/Family Trailer Award (2014)
 Winner International Movie Trailer Festival (IMTF) 2013
 Winner the category Digital Entertainment – Animation (Battle of Surabaya), Indonesia ICT Award 2012
 Nominae Digital Entertainment – Animation (Belajar Di sekolah), Indonesia ICT Award 2012
 Nominee Digital Entertainment – Animation (Pohon Pisang), Indonesia ICT Award 2012.
 Nominee Digital Entertainment – Animation (Layang-layang), Indonesia ICT Award 2012
 Nominee Digital Entertainment – Animation (Hadiah Kejujuran), Indonesia ICT Award 2012
 1st Winner Indigo Fellowship Category in Film Animation, by PT Telekomunikasi Indonesia, Tbk. (2012)
 Nominee Animated Film in Apresiasi Film Indonesia by Art and Film Board of Ministry of Culture & Education of The Republic of Indonesia. (2012)

Filmography

Producer
 AJISAKA: The King and the Flower of Life (executive producer) (filming)
 Tumbal: The Ritual (executive producer), 2018. 
 November 10 (executive producer) / (producer), 2015
 Petualangan Abdan (short animation) Episode: Belajar Di Sekolah, 2008
 Petualangan Abdan (short animation) Episode:Pohon Pisang, 2009.
 Petualangan Abdan (short animation) episode: (Layang-layang), 2010
 Petualangan Abdan (short animation) episode: (Hadiah Kejujuran), 2011

Writer
 AJISAKA: The King and the Flower of Life (original story) (filming) 
 November 10 (story), 2015.
 Petualangan Abdan (short animation) Episode: Belajar Di Sekolah, 2008
 Petualangan Abdan (short animation) Episode: Pohon Pisang, 2009.
 Petualangan Abdan (short animation) episode: Layang-layang, 2010
 Petualangan Abdan (short animation) episode: Hadiah Kejujuran, 2011

Director
 AJISAKA: The King and the Flower of Life (filming)

Known For
 Battle of Surabaya

References

1960 births
Living people
Gadjah Mada University alumni